The Critics' Choice Super Award for Best Actress in an Action Series is an award presented by the Critics Choice Association to the best actress in an action television series.

Winners and Nominees

Actresses with multiple nominations 
 Angela Bassett – 3
 Queen Latifah, Olivia Liang – 2

See also 
 Critics' Choice Super Award for Best Action Series

References

Broadcast Film Critics Association Awards
Awards for actresses